Benjamin Flounders (17 June 1768 – 19 April 1846) was a prominent English Quaker with business interests in key new industries and developments at the time of the Mid-Industrial Revolution, such as The Stockton and Darlington Railway (of which he was a founding Director) and new canals in his native North-East England; he operated his own family businesses very successfully with large interests in timber for shipbuilding (at the time of the War with France), also owning two linen mills and large estates in places as diverse as Egham, Surrey and Glasgow. >

Early life 

Flounders was born at Crathorne in 1768, and educated at Ackworth School, Leeds.

Family losses 

Flounders' life was touched by tragedy with the loss of his first wife Mary Walker (daughter of a Quaker shipbuilder) while giving birth to a premature baby in 1801. They had only married two years previously. Mary, his wife, had produced a daughter early in their marriage, also called Mary, who survived to adulthood and to whom Flounders was very close. The same year his sister died.

In 1812, after a very suitable interval, Flounders married for the second time, to Hannah Chapman, another Quaker, and in 1813 a son was produced, but as a result of TB, both mother and infant son died later in 1813.

New endeavours 

Flounders became a JP for Shropshire. In 1813 he was one of three gentlemen nominated for appointment as High Sheriff of Shropshire but he declined on the grounds he lived permanently in Yarm and would therefore be living up to 180 miles away from Shrewsbury where the courts would be held.  He appealed against similar nominations for similar reasons in 1814, 1820 and 1836. He also became JP for the counties of Durham and the North Riding of Yorkshire and, on 29 December 1817 he received a Church of England baptism at the parish church at Stainton, County Durham. He then became a Trustee of a new turnpike Toll road, invested £10,000 in French water stocks, with further investment subsequently — attaining massive returns for the time without massive risk. After the death of his mother in 1829 he embarked on the fashionable Grand Tour of Europe with his daughter Mary (now 29), visiting the major cities and sights and spending some time in Rome.

Flounders Folly 

His best-known achievement, ironically, was the building of a folly tower, the eponymous Flounders' Folly in South Shropshire near Craven Arms and prominent on the skyline on Callow Hill, the highest point of Wenlock Edge. The folly commands extensive views over the surrounding Stretton Hills, Wenlock Edge, the Long Mynd and Clee Hills and even further afield to the Brecon Beacons, Radnor Hills, Malvern Hills and Black Mountains. The folly was built to celebrate his attaining 70 years, to commemorate his lifelong endeavours and a life well spent and to celebrate the forthcoming marriage of his daughter Mary and the coming of age of his neighbour and associate in Shropshire, Lord Clive.

On his return from his European travels Benjamin started plans to build the folly. (He had inherited the Culmington estate just north of Ludlow, Shropshire, from his wealthy uncle, one Gideon Bickerdike, another very influential Quaker, who died in 1810.) Benjamin's travels with his daughter and his newer connections in Shropshire especially may have influenced his thinking. At this time he was, through his Ludlow estate, a neighbour of Robert Clive, Earl Craven and Sir (Thomas) Richard Swinnerton-Dyer, Baronet.

His agent was instructed to negotiate with several local estates to purchase the land the folly was to be erected on and in 1836 the land was marked out, construction commencing at a time of possibly high levels of unemployment locally; it has been suggested that many local masons, builders and construction workers were happy to be paid to build a folly for an influential man with excellent local connections and the possibility of further contracts resulting. However, many workers were it seems occupied with the building of Ludlow's brand new Assembly Rooms at this time too (finished in 1840). So maybe the folly was not meant to be a purely philanthropical undertaking.

At around this time Flounders' daughter Mary was engaged to marry a Major Arthur Lowe in London. Flounders did not wholeheartedly approve of the Major as Mary — his closest relative and family member — was to be 'taken from him' by this marriage.

Mary's death 

The couple were married but tragedy was to strike Flounders yet again — Mary, Flounders' sole heir, died in 1844, before a home which Flounders was to have funded and given to Mary and Lowe at Culmington was even built. Flounders and Lowe now really fell out — Major Lowe wanted Mary buried in a place of his choosing, Flounders wanted his daughter buried in the parish churchyard at Yarm in his native North-East, in the plot set out for himself and his family. Lowe had Mary buried there — but right against the church wall—so her father could never be laid next to her.

Flounders simply bought the land on the other side of the church wall, gave the land to the Yarm church and had the wall diverted and extended to thwart Lowe's scheme. Flounders also moved to disinherit Lowe — now his son-in-law and heir. Lowe would have inherited extensive business interests, land and property — instead he was left with just an annuity.

Preparations 

The stress of what he saw as an unsuitable marriage on his daughter's part, then her tragic (and still childless) death, and the feud with Lowe had taken its toll on aged Benjamin Flounders — after 1844–45 he focused on setting his affairs in order, making sure his by now vast wealth and estate was divided according to his wishes, re-writing his will and taking pains to ensure his faithful estate servants were provided for through bequests of money in lump sums or annuities, that Quaker-founded schools all over the North-East were bequeathed huge funds, benefiting over 20 schools such as Barnard Castle School and the famous Quaker school, Ackworth School, and even small bequests of coal and blankets were made to the poor of Yarm. His house contents went to his housekeeper.  Following the death of the last annuitant from his estate in 1884 Yarm was provided with new premises for its Grammar School.

Death and legacy 

Flounders died in 1846, aged 77 — without any surviving family, and just two years after his daughter Mary. Under his will all his wealth went to others; everything he was born into, had worked and endeavoured to achieve over a very long and prosperous life was in effect reinvested for the greater good. Rather than passing (in the greater part anyway) simply to his daughter and her husband, it was spread far and wide benefiting countless school pupils over many generations.

Further reading

References

English Quakers
1768 births
1846 deaths